Creep Wit' Me is the debut album by East Coast hip hop duo Ill Al Skratch. It was released on August 2, 1994 by Mercury Records. It features slow and smooth production from The LG Experience and LoRider, as well as light party rhymes. It was Ill Al Skratch's most commercially successful album peaking at #137 on the Billboard 200. Nonetheless, Al Skratch blames its lack of more success on poor distribution by Mercury Records. It contains three singles: "Where My Homiez? (Come Around My Way)," "I'll Take Her" and "Chill with That." The first of the three was an underground hit that managed to reach #34 on the Hot R&B/Hip-Hop Singles & Tracks chart. It was followed by "I'll Take Her," a single that featured R&B singer Brian McKnight and reached the Billboard Hot 100. It was followed by the last and least commercially successful of the three singles, "Chill with That."

Track listing 
 "They Got Love for Us" (1:21)
 "Where My Homiez? (Come Around My Way)" (5:41)
 "This Is for My Homiez" (5:35)
 "I'll Take Her" (4:53)
 Featuring Brian McKnight
 "Chill with That" (4:53)
 "Where My Homiez? (Come Around My Way) (Dub Version)" (6:14)
 "Creep Wit' Me" (3:51)
 "Get Dough" (4:44)
 "The Brooklyn Uptown Connection" (4:20)
 Featuring LRC, Mark Sparks & Zoundwavez
 "Classic Shit (Ill's Solo)" (4:14)
 "Summertime (It's All Good) (Al's Solo)" (4:34)
 "I'll Take Her (Brian's Flow)" (4:24)
 Featuring Brian McKnight

Instrumental/production credits 
 Production: The LG Experience & LoRider
 Guitar: LoRider & Mike Tyler 
 Bass guitar: LoRider
 Keyboards: LoRider
 Organ (Hammond B3): Loris Holland 
 Percussion (Beats): LG
 "Music Vibes": LG

Samples 

 "This Is for My Homiez"
 Contains samples from "Munchies for Your Love" by Bootsy's Rubber Band
 Contains samples from "Choosey Lover" by The Isley Brothers.
 "Where My Homiez? (Come Around My Way)"
 Contains samples from "Never, Never Gonna Give You Up" and "Playing Your Game Baby" by Barry White
 "I'll Take Her"
 Contains samples from "Jane" by EPMD
 Contains samples from "You're So Good to Me" by Curtis Mayfield
 "Chill with That"
 Contains samples from "The Clincher" by David Newman
 Contains samples from "Hydra" by Grover Washington, Jr.
 "Creep wit' Me"
 Contains samples from "Overnight Sensation" by Avalanche 
 Contains samples from "Deep Cover" by Dr. Dre & Snoop Dogg
 "Get Dough"
 Contains samples from "In the Mood" by Tyrone Davis
 Contains samples from "Overnight Sensation" by Avalanche
 Contains samples from "The Creeper" by Young-Holt Unlimited
 "Classic Shit (Ill's Solo)"
 Contains samples from "The Breakdown (Part II)" by Rufus Thomas 
 Contains samples from "(It's Not the Express) It's the JB's Monaurail" by The J.B.'s
 Contains samples from "Red Baron" by Billy Cobham

Chart positions

Album

Singles

References 

1994 albums
Ill Al Skratch albums